The Strömgren photometric system, abbreviated also as uvbyβ or simply uvby, and sometimes referred as Strömgren - Crawford photometric system, is a four-colour medium-passband photometric system plus Hβ (H-beta) filters for determining magnitudes and obtaining spectral classification of stars. Its use was pioneered by the Danish astronomer Bengt Strömgren in 1956 and was extended by his colleague the American astronomer David L. Crawford in 1958.

It is often considered to be a powerful tool and successful investigating the brightness and effective temperature of stars. This photometric system also has a general advantage as it can be used to measure the effects of reddening and  interstellar extinction. This system also allows calculation of parameters from the b and y filters (b − y) without the effects of reddening, termed m 1 and c 1.

Wavelength and half-width response functions
{| border="1" cellspacing="0" cellpadding="8"
|- bgcolor="#FFFFCC"

!
!u
!v
!b
!y
!βnarrow
!βwide
|- bgcolor="#FFFFEE"
|align="center" bgcolor="#FFFFCC"|Peak wavelength (nm)
|align="center"|350
|align="center"|411
|align="center"|467
|align="center"|547
|align="center"|485.8
|align="center"|485
|-
|align="center" bgcolor="#FFFFCC"|Half-width (nm)
|align="center"|30
|align="center"|19
|align="center"|18
|align="center"|23
|align="center"|2.9
|align="center"|12.9
|}

Indices

There are four main highly applied and technical indices: (b−y); m1; c1; and β.

m1 = (v−b) − (b−y)

c1 = (u−v) − (v−b)

β = βnarrow−βwide

Where; 

y magnitudes are well-correlated with Johnson-Morgan V magnitudes (its V band).

(b−y) is sensitive to stellar temperature (measure of Paschen continuum).

c1 is sensitive to the surface gravity (measures Balmer discontinuity strength).

m1 is sensitive to the metallicity (measure of line blanketing).

See also
 Photometric systems
 Stellar classification

References

External links
 The Asiago Database on Photometric Systems
 The uvby photometric system
 Stromgren photometric system tutorial
 SAGA: Strömgren survey for Asteroseismology and Galactic Archaeology

Photometric systems